Bukit, the Indonesian or Malay word for hill, may refer to:
 Bukit Peninsula, area in Bali, Indonesia
 Kampong Bukit, village in Tutong District, Brunei